Orangia sporadica is a species of small air-breathing land snail, a terrestrial pulmonate gastropod mollusk in the family Charopidae. This species is endemic to French Polynesia.

References

Fauna of French Polynesia
Orangia
Taxonomy articles created by Polbot